Playback is the first studio album by the American synthpop band SSQ, released in 1983 by Enigma and EMI America Records. It was the only album released by the band as SSQ until the release of their second album Jet Town Je t'aime in 2020, though the band members later worked on lead singer Stacey Q's debut album Better Than Heaven (1986) and follow-up album, Hard Machine (1988).

Music videos

Music videos were released for both "Synthicide" and "Screaming In My Pillow." There were three different videos released for "Screaming In My Pillow": The first version was a PG-13-rated version that received airplay on MTV. A more controversial, "uncensored" version was aired on Playboy TV depicting full-frontal nudity and lesbianism by Stacey Swain and an unknown model. A third video, called the NC-17 version, was considered too graphic for mainstream airplay. It was included on Red Hot Rock, a VHS compilation of uncensored music videos.

Track listing

Personnel
 Stacey Q – vocals
 Jon St. James – guitars, synthesizer, vocals
 John Van Tongeren – synthesizer
 Rich West – synthesizer
 Karl Moet – drum systems
 Skip Hahn – keyboards, vocoder

Legacy
"Synthicide", "Big Electronic Beat", and "Clockwork" appeared on the soundtrack of the 1984 film Hardbodies while "Synthicide" and "Anonymous" appeared on the soundtrack of the 1985 film Cavegirl. "Anonymous" plays over the end credits of the 2010 film Beyond The Black Rainbow.

The album was re-released on July 10, 2014, by F1 Music as a digital download on the iTunes Store and Amazon. It has never been issued on a legitimate compact disc by any company. It was originally issued on vinyl and cassette only.

References

1983 debut albums
Stacey Q albums
Enigma Records albums
EMI America Records albums
New wave albums by American artists